Vladyslav Dolohodin (born 23 February 1972 in Yuzhno-Sakhalinsk) is a retired sprinter from Ukraine, who competed at the 1996 Summer Olympics for his native country. He set his personal best in the men's 100 metres (10.35) on 1994-07-06 in Lausanne.

In 1994 Dolohodin won silver medals in 200 m at the European Indoor Championships in Paris and the European Championships in Helsinki. At the European Championships he won another silver medal in 4 x 100 m relay. His personal best in the men's 200 m (20.36) was set on 1994-08-28 in Rieti.

References

sports-reference

1972 births
Living people
People from Yuzhno-Sakhalinsk
Ukrainian male sprinters
Athletes (track and field) at the 1996 Summer Olympics
Olympic athletes of Ukraine
European Athletics Championships medalists
20th-century Ukrainian people
21st-century Ukrainian people